The San Diego Open was a golf tournament on the LPGA Tour, played in 1953. It was played at the Mission Course in San Diego, California. Louise Suggs was the winner.

References

Former LPGA Tour events
Golf in California
Women's sports in California